Gotovac is a surname commonly found in Croatia and may refer to:

Frano Gotovac (1928–1991), Croatian architect and comic artist
Jakov Gotovac (1895–1982), Croatian composer and conductor
Mani Gotovac (1939-2019), Croatian playwright and theatrologist
Pero Gotovac (1927-2017), Croatian composer
Tomislav Gotovac (1937-2010), Croatian multimedia artist
Vlado Gotovac (1930–2000), Croatian poet and politician